Margaret G. Johnson, (18981967) was a Sri Lankan born Australian portrait artist.

Early life
Margaret G. Woods was born to father James Wood, a Scotsman in Kadugannawa, Ceylon. She was one of seven children who all had an interest painting and drawing. At a young age her father immigrated to Western Australia. She was educated in Perth, Western Australia and after completing her schooling was sent to the Glasgow School of Art.

Education
She was fifteen years old when she attended the Glasgow School of Art, three years younger than the usual entrance age. She studied under Maurice Greiffenhagen and Professor McKeller, concentrating on painting and modelling. She completed her four-year course in three years. She returned to Western Australia after the end of World War I and married.

Career
As a portrait artist she specialised in portraiture painting especially watercolours but also had works in pencil, pastels and oil. Her portrait works would be found in the National Gallery of Australia, Parliament House and at the Perth City Council. Some of her works include, J.W. Johnson Esq., The Tartan Scarf, The Debutante and the Resting Model. Her portrait works of Prime Minister John Curtin and Perth Art Gallery curator G. Pitt-Morrison are found in the Art Gallery of Western Australia while Sir James Mitchell's portrait was in the Treasurer Building and Sir John Kirwan in Parliament House. She had also exhibited the G. Pitt-Morrison work for the Archibald Prize. Other exhibits for the prize included General Gordon Bennett.

She was a member of the West Australian Society of Arts. She taught painting and art at the Busselton Technical School.

Edith Dircksey Cowan Memorial
In 1934, her model for a portrait plaque of Edith Cowan was chosen from several local West Australian entries to be the choice for a memorial work on a clock tower in Kings Park, Perth honouring the latter. The Edith Cowan bust was in high relief above a wreath of gum leaves and nuts and would be cast in bronze, above a bronze inscription on the eastern face of the clock tower.

Busselton Art Society 
The first meeting of the Busselton Art Society was on the 22nd of April 1959 with 34 supporters and at 61 years of age Margaret Johnson was elected the inaugural President, a position she held for five years. She was also the leading tutor at the Society for eight years and they met in the Primary School Class Room, Prince Street Busselton

She also taught at the Busselton Technical College and privately. One of her notable students and fellow Foundation Member of the Busselton Art Society was Mavis Elizabeth Lightly (nee Allen) 1911-1988 who was greatly inspired by Margaret Johnson to develop her skill. Mavis Elizabeth Lightly was an oil painter with an impressive body of work covering landscape, still life, and portraits and every item sold in her first Art Exhibition in 1952 in the Country Women’s Association Hall.

An extensive retrospective exhibition for Margaret Johnson was held by the Busselton Art Society in 1969, two years after her death on 26 September 1967, with 73 of her artworks and this was followed 30 years later in 1999, when 28 of her works were shown in a Retrospective Exhibition in the Art Society Gallery, Queen Street Busselton.

References

1898 births
1967 deaths
Australian artists
Australian portrait painters
20th-century Australian women artists
20th-century Australian artists
Australian women painters
Australian people of Sri Lankan descent
British people in British Ceylon
British emigrants to Australia